The 2017–18 Austrian Cup was the 84th edition of the national cup in Austrian football. The champions of the cup, Sturm Graz, earned a place in the 2018–19 Europa League and would have begun play in the third qualifying round. Sixty–four clubs participated in this season's cup competition.

Red Bull Salzburg were the defending champions after winning the competition in the previous season by defeating SK Rapid Wien in the final.

First round
Thirty–two first round matches were played between 14 and 18 July 2017.

Second round
Second round matches were played 18–26 September 2017. The draw for the second round was held 8 August 2017.

Third round
Third round matches were played 24–25 October 2017.

Quarter-finals
Quarter-final matches were played 27–28 February 2018.

Semi-finals
Semi-final matches were played 18 April 2018.

Final

See also
 2017–18 Austrian Football Bundesliga

References

External links 
 soccerway.com

Austrian Cup seasons
Cup
Austrian Cup